Edward Lachman (born March 31, 1948) is an American cinematographer and director. Lachman is mostly associated with the American independent film movement, and has served as director of photography on films by Todd Haynes (including Far from Heaven in 2002 and Carol in 2015, both of which earned Lachman Oscar nominations), Ulrich Seidl, Wim Wenders, Steven Soderbergh and Paul Schrader. His other work includes Werner Herzog's La Soufrière (1977), Desperately Seeking Susan (1985), Sofia Coppola's directorial debut, The Virgin Suicides (1999), Robert Altman's last picture A Prairie Home Companion (2006), and Todd Solondz's Life During Wartime (2009). He is a member of the American Society of Cinematographers.

In 1989, Lachman co-directed a segment of the anthology film Imagining America. In 2002, Lachman co-directed the controversial Ken Park with Larry Clark. In 2013, Lachman produced a series of videos in collaboration with French electronic duo Daft Punk, for the duo's album Random Access Memories.

Life and education 
Lachman was born to a Jewish family in Morristown, New Jersey, the son of Rosabel (Roth) and Edward Lachman, a movie theater distributor and owner. He attended Harvard University and studied in France at the University of Tours before pursuing a BFA in painting at Ohio University. He has a daughter, Bella Lachman (b. 2005) who lives in Amsterdam.

Filmography

Documentaries

Short films

Television

References

External links
 

1948 births
Living people
American cinematographers
20th-century American Jews
University of Tours alumni
Harvard University alumni
Independent Spirit Award winners
Jewish film people
Ohio University alumni
People from Morristown, New Jersey
21st-century American Jews